Leonid Mykolayovych Shmuts (born October 8, 1948 in Nikopol) is a retired Ukrainian and Soviet football player.

Honours
 Soviet Top League winner: 1970.

International career
Shmuts made his debut for USSR on February 19, 1971 in a friendly against Mexico national football team. He was selected for the 1970 FIFA World Cup squad, but did not play in any games at the tournament.

Own goal 

Shmuts is well known for the own goal that he scored in the Soviet league game against FC Ararat Yerevan on April 17, 1971. Shumts was going to throw the ball to his teammate and had already taken his hand with the ball back, but suddenly noticed that an Ararat player could intercept the ball and stopped the movement. The ball left his hand and crossed the goal line. That was the only goal in the game. This mistake was a heavy blow for the goalkeeper who never returned to his previous level of playing and never played again for the national team.

External links
  Profile

1948 births
Living people
People from Nikopol, Ukraine
Ukrainian footballers
Soviet footballers
Soviet Union international footballers
PFC CSKA Moscow players
FC Arsenal Kyiv players
Soviet Top League players
1970 FIFA World Cup players
Association football goalkeepers
Sportspeople from Dnipropetrovsk Oblast